Surya Malla was a king of the Malla dynasty and the second king of Kantipur. He succeeded his father Ratna Malla and ruled from 1520 to 1530.

Reign 
According to the Bhāsāvamsävali and Padmagiri's Vamsävali, he captured Sankhu and made it his capital. In 1526, Mukunda Sen of Palpa attacked the entire Kathmandu valley and had surrounded both Kantipur, and Patan at one time.

He died in 1530 and was succeeded by his son Amara Malla.

References

1530 deaths
16th-century Nepalese people
Malla rulers of Kantipur
Year of birth unknown

Nepalese monarchs